Jaren Station is a railway station located at Jaren in Oppland, Norway. The station is the terminus for the Oslo Commuter Rail, but is also served by regional trains that continue to Gjøvik. Both services are provided by Vy Gjøvikbanen.

History
The station was opened in 1900 as a station on the North Line between Grefsen and Røykenvik. In 1902 the extension from Jaren to Gjøvik was finished, and the line changed name to the Gjøvik Line. The branch line to Røykenvik too the name Røykenvik Line. The branch was abandoned in 1957.

The restaurant was taken over by Norsk Spisevognselskap on 15 January 1930, but was privatized again from 15 October 1944.

References

External links 
 Entry at Jernbaneverket <
 Entry at the Norwegian Railway Club 

Railway stations on the Gjøvik Line
Railway stations in Oppland
Railway stations opened in 1900
1900 establishments in Norway
Gran, Norway